Northern District was an electoral district for the Legislative Council of South Australia from 1882 until 1975. Prior to the passing of the Constitution Act Further Amendment Act 1881, the Legislative Council was 18 members elected by people from across the entire Province. From 1975, the Council returned to being elected from the entire state (the province had become a state of Australia in 1901).

At its creation in 1882, the Northern District consisted of three electoral districts for the South Australian House of Assembly - Wallaroo, Stanley and Flinders. It covered the area of Eyre Peninsula, Yorke Peninsula, Flinders Ranges, the upper Mid North and any settlers in areas further north.

Members
When created, the district was to elect six members to the Legislative Council which had been increased to 24 members, six from each of four districts. Transitional arrangements meant that members were only to be elected from the new districts as the terms of the existing members expired. From 1891, all members were elected by districts.

The Constitution Act Amendment Act 1901 reduced the size of the parliament, and Northern District then elected four members from the new enlarged Assembly districts of Stanley, Burra Burra, Flinders,  and the Northern Territory. This added the Northern Territory and the lower Mid North to the Northern District.

From this double dissolution election, each district only elected 4 members, for two terms of the lower house, Legislative Council elections are held at the same time as House of Assembly elections.

References

Former electoral districts of South Australia